"A Favor House Atlantic" is a song by American rock band Coheed and Cambria from their 2003 album In Keeping Secrets of Silent Earth: 3. In the United States, it remains Coheed and Cambria's highest charting song, having peaked at No. 13 on Billboard's Alternative Songs chart. It reached No. 77 on the UK Singles Chart.

The song features the characters Claudio and Al the Killer, and is part of the sci-fi saga that is present in all of the band's songs. In contrast to other songs on the album, "A Favor House Atlantic" has been described as a "fairly straightforward [slice] of emo". Vulture.com described the song as a Trojan Horse of invading emo disguised as pop music.

The song is featured in ATV Offroad Fury 3. It was also made available as a downloadable, playable track for the music video game series Rock Band as part of the Bonnaroo Pack. It also appears on the soundtrack to Major League Baseball 2K9.

Variety ranked it as one of the best emo songs of all time in 2022.

Music video
There are two versions of the music video of the song. The first, directed by Christian Winters, revolves around the band in a bar, attempting to pick up women. Meanwhile, an alternate version of the band performs the song on the stage. This version could be considered an "80s" version of the band as they wear typical 80s rock style attire such as headbands and tight clothes.

The video's humor is very tongue-in-cheek featuring antics such as drummer Josh Eppard attempting to look up girls' dresses, bassist Michael Todd in a drunken stupor soliciting the services of a drag queen, and the band insulting itself.

The second version is an animated video, telling a story from the Amory Wars. Rather than being about Claudio and Al the Killer, however, it is about Coheed and Cambria as teenagers.

Track listing

Chart performance

References

External links
 Coheed and Cambria Official Website

Coheed and Cambria songs
2003 songs
2004 singles
Columbia Records singles
Songs written by Claudio Sanchez